Marcos Daniel was the defending champion, but he withdrew before his match against Sebastián Decoud in the quarterfinals.
Robert Farah won in the final 6–3, 2–6, 7–6(3), against Carlos Salamanca.

Seeds

  Santiago Giraldo (quarterfinals)
  Alejandro Falla (first round)
  Marcos Daniel (quarterfinals, withdrew due to back pain)
  Nicolás Massú (first round)
  João Souza (first round)
  Andre Begemann (first round)
  Carlos Salamanca (final)
  Santiago González (first round, retired due to a right hand injury)

Draw

Finals

Top half

Bottom half

References
Main Draw
Qualifying Singles

Seguros Bolivar Open Bogota - Singles
2010 MS